Malcolm Wilson FRSE FLS (1882–1960) was a 20th-century Scottish botanist and mycologist. He was an expert on the identification of dry rot and its remediation.

Life
He studied Science at the University of London, graduating BSc in 1905. In 1909 he became Senior Demonstrator in Botany at Imperial College, London. He gained a doctorate (DSc) in 1911. He was created a Fellow of the Linnean Society in 1910.

He joined the Botany Department of Edinburgh University in 1911 as the first lecturer in both Mycology and Bacteriology.

During the First World War he returned to London to serve as a pathologist at the County of London War Hospital. He returned to Edinburgh University after the war.

In 1920 he was elected a Fellow of the Royal Society of Edinburgh. His proposers were Sir Isaac Bayley Balfour, Frederick Orpen Bower, James Hartley Ashworth and Robert Wallace.

His students included Dr Mary Noble (1911-2002) and Douglas Mackay Henderson.

He retired in  1951 and went to live with his son Graham in Sheffield  and died there on 8 July 1960.

Family

He was father to Graham Malcolm Wilson and Cedric Wilson.

Publications

The Blueing of Coniferous Timber (1923)
British Rust Fungi (completed and published by Douglas Mackay Henderson in 1966)

References

1882 births
1960 deaths
Alumni of the University of London
Scottish mycologists
Academics of the University of Edinburgh
Fellows of the Royal Society of Edinburgh
Fellows of the Linnean Society of London